Akoya may refer to:

People
 Akoya Sogi Japanese voice actress

Other
 Akoya condominiums, is a 47-story, high-rise residential condominium located in Miami Beach
 Akoya (gastropod), a genus of sea snails
 Akoya akoya (Calliostoma akoya), a species of sea snail
 Akoya pearl oyster (Pinctada fucata), a species of pearl oyster
 LISA Akoya, a single engine light aircraft

Japanese feminine given names